Frédéric Encel (born 4 March 1969) is a French writer and scholar of geopolitics.  He received his DEA in geopolitics from the Centre de recherches et d’analyses géopolitiques at the University of Paris VIII in 1992.  He remained there studying under Yves Lacoste and earned his doctorate in geopolitics in 1997. He teaches international relations at the ESG Management School. He frequently points out the Iranian danger in French press.

Works
 
 
 
  (with Eric Keslassy)
  (with François Thual)
  (with Olivier Guez)
 
 
 
  (new edition 2008)

References

External links
 Official site

1969 births
Living people
Geopoliticians
French political scientists
French male non-fiction writers
Academic staff of Sciences Po
Knights of the Ordre national du Mérite